Folke Ivar Reinhold Bohlin (20 March 1903 – 12 June 1972) was a Swedish sailor who competed in the 1948 and 1956 Summer Olympics.

In 1948 he won the silver medal as helmsman of the Swedish boat Slaghöken in the Dragon class event. Eight years later he won the gold medal as helmsman of the Swedish boat Slaghöken II in the Dragon class competition.

See also
 List of Olympic medalists in Dragon class sailing

References

External links
 

1903 births
1972 deaths
Swedish male sailors (sport)
Olympic sailors of Sweden
Sailors at the 1948 Summer Olympics – Dragon
Sailors at the 1956 Summer Olympics – Dragon
Olympic gold medalists for Sweden
Olympic silver medalists for Sweden
Olympic medalists in sailing
Royal Gothenburg Yacht Club sailors
Medalists at the 1956 Summer Olympics
Medalists at the 1948 Summer Olympics
Sportspeople from Gothenburg
20th-century Swedish people